Chadov (masculine) or Chadova (feminine) is a Russian surname. Notable people with the surname include:

Andrei Chadov (born 1980), Russian actor
Vyacheslav Chadov (born 1986), Russian footballer

Russian-language surnames